Archibald Nicol (1865–1941) was a Scottish footballer who played in the English Football League for Bury.

References

1865 births
1941 deaths
Scottish footballers
English Football League players
Association football midfielders
Cowdenbeath F.C. players
Lochgelly United F.C. players
Bury F.C. players
Dunfermline Athletic F.C. players